Albert Frost is a South African blues singer, rock guitarist and producer who has been performed since 1994. In 2017 he won the SAMA Award for Best Rock Album for The Wake Up.

He has played with The Blues Broers since 1994 at the age of 17.

Discography

with The Blues Broers 

 Sharp Street (1995)
 Been Around (1996)
 Cellar Tapes (1998)
 Out Of The Blue (2011)
 Into The Red (2014)

with Koos Kombuis 

 Blou Kombuis (2000)
 Langpad Na Lekkersing (2016)

with Frosted Orange 

 My Love Is A Leopard (2002)

with Arno Carstens 

 Another Universe (2004)
 The Hello Goodbye Boys (2005)

with Anton Goosen 

 Padkos (2017)

Solo 

 Catfish (2002)
 Devils & Gods (2009)
 Live In Grahamstown (2013)
 The Wake Up (2016)
 Sacred Sound (2021)

References

External links 
 Official Albert Frost website 

Living people
South African guitarists
Year of birth missing (living people)